The 2016–17 Macedonian First League was the 25th season of the Macedonian First League, with 10 teams participating in it. The season's regular season started on 19 November 2016 and finished on 4 March 2017. MZT Skopje and Karpoš Sokoli joined the league in a further stage. The season finished with the last game of the Finals on 27 May 2017. MZT Skopje won its sixth national title.

Teams
MZT Skopje participated in both ABA League and EuroCup Basketball. Karpoš Sokoli participated in both ABA League and Balkan International Basketball League. Both teams would join the First League after January 2017 with the start of the second stage.

Regular season

Second stage

Group 1 to 6

Group 7 to 10
Matches of the regular season are included in the final table of the group.

Playoffs

Awards

MVP

References

External links
 Macedonian First League website 
 Macedonian First League at Eurobasket.com

Macedonian First League (basketball) seasons
Macedonian
Basketball